Seh Gerdekan (also Romanized as Seh Gerdekān) is a village in Piran Rural District, in the Central District of Piranshahr County, West Azerbaijan Province, Iran. At the 2006 census, its population was 77, in 8 families.

References 

Populated places in Piranshahr County